Elections to Kent County Council were held on 6 May 2021, alongside other local elections.

81 councillors were elected from 71 electoral divisions.

Summary

Election result

|-

Results by Division

Ashford

District summary

Division results

Canterbury

District summary

Division results

Dartford

District summary

Division results

Dover

District summary

Division results

Folkestone and Hythe

District summary

Division results

 
The election in Elham Valley was deferred to 17 June 2021 due to the death of a candidate after the close of nominations.

Gravesham

District summary

Division results

Maidstone

District summary

Division results

Sevenoaks

District summary

Division results

Swale

District summary

Division results

Thanet

District summary

Division results

Tonbridge and Malling

District summary

Division results

Tunbridge Wells

District summary

Division results

By-elections

Wilmington

Hythe West

References 

Kent County Council elections
2021 English local elections
2020s in Kent